Highway 19 is the main north-south thoroughfare on Vancouver Island from Nanaimo to Port Hardy. A highway has existed on the Island since about 1912. Originally gravel and rough, the highway was an essential link together with the Esquimalt & Nanaimo Railway. The paved highway first opened in 1953, replacing a stretch of Highway 1 between Nanaimo and Campbell River, finally being extended to the northern tip of the island in the late 1970s.

Route description

Highway 19's northern end is located at the Bear Cove ferry terminal, across the bay from Port Hardy. The highway proceeds southwest from the ferry dock for 5 km (3 mi) to a junction with the main road to the centre of Port Hardy, then turns southeast, travelling for 16 km (10 mi) to Highway 30, and then further east for 20 km (12 mi) to the main road to Port McNeill. The highway then follows the eastern shore of Nimpkish Lake and the Nimpkish River through a long stretch of dense forest terrain for 64 km (40 mi) southeast, until reaching a junction with the community of Woss, then travelling another 65 km east (40 mi), through the boundary between the Regional Districts of Mount Waddington and Strathcona, to a junction with Sayward, and finally entering the city of Campbell River another 64 km (40 mi) southeast, at a junction with Highways 28 and 19A, just past the river that the city is named for.

The entire stretch of Highway 19 north of Campbell River is an undivided two-lane configuration. Once at the junction with Highways 28 and 19A, Highway 19 separates into an expressway configuration, built between 1996 and 2001. In Campbell River, the expressway shares its northbound lanes with Tamarac Street, and its southbound lanes with Willow Street.

South from Campbell River, Highway 19 is divided primarily by a concrete wall, and goes through a series of six at-grade intersections, five of them possessing exit numbers. 52 km (32 mi) south of Campbell River, Highway 19 reaches its first interchange, with a four-lane arterial highway that goes west to the village of Cumberland and east to the communities of Courtenay and Comox. Past the Courtenay Interchange, Highway 19 is divided by a grass median. 16 km (10 mi) later, Highway 19 reaches another interchange, this time with a two-lane road that goes a short distance east to the B.C. Ferry terminal at Buckley Bay. There are two more at-grade intersections on Highway 19 in the 41 km (25 mi) between the Buckley Bay Interchange and the interchange with Highway 4, which goes north into Qualicum Beach. 9 km (6 mi) later, Highway 19 goes through another interchange, this time with Highway 4A, which goes east into Parksville.  The next interchange, at Craig's Crossing, is another 5 km south (3 mi).

Past the Craig's Crossing Interchange, Highway 19 resumes its 1953 alignment, which today is a 4-lane, divided arterial highway with a concrete median barrier mostly constructed during the 1970s. The highway passes southeast through the communities of Nanoose Bay and Lantzville before finally entering the north part of Nanaimo. Highway 19 then veers south onto a 20 km (12 mi) long four-lane expressway known as the "Nanaimo Parkway", which has five at-grade intersections along its length.  Highway 19's Nanaimo Parkway portion ends at an interchange with the Trans Canada and Cedar Road. At the interchange with Cedar Road, Highway 19 proceeds to share an alignment with the Trans-Canada Highway south for 2 km (1¼ mi) before turning eastward at another interchange (Duke Point Highway). Highway 19 then crosses over the Nanaimo River 2 km (1¼ mi) later, passes through an interchange at Maughan Rd and then goes northward for 5 km (3 mi), finally terminating at the B.C. Ferry terminal at Duke Point.

The total closure of any part of that stretch of road would require a long detour for intra-island traffic, including four ferry segments.

History

Completed in 1953, the highway was built mostly built along the same route that Highway 19A follows today. It originally only ran from Nanaimo to Campbell River, but since seen two major extensions. The highway was initially extended north to Kelsey Bay to meet B.C. Ferries' service to Prince Rupert in 1965 with its official opening being on the 14 September. A sod turning ceremony had been held three years earlier in April 1962 and was officiated by Phil Gaglardi, the Highways Minister. The cost of the extension was $50 million (equivalent to 437.65 million in 2022)

By 1979, the highway was further extended north to Port Hardy, where it now terminates at the Bear Cove ferry terminal. It was officially opened on 21 September 1979 by highways minister Alex Fraser and premier Bill Bennett. With the extension completed, B.C. Ferries moved its southern terminus for the Prince Rupert run north to Port Hardy. Surveying for the extension had started 1970.
 with the project being fully complete by the summer of 1980. The project cost $65 million (equivalent to $247.89 million in 2022) 

In the late 1990s and early 2000s, a highway building program called the Vancouver Island Highway Project saw massive upgrades to the Island Highway from Victoria all the way to Campbell River. Apart of the program consisted of the building of many kilometres of new multi-lane highway to replace sections of what is now Highway 19A.
Parts of the project included a new bypass of Nanaimo (now known as the Nanaimo Parkway), a short expressway to the Duke Point Ferry Terminal, a bypass of southern Campbell River and a new 128 kilometre expressway between Parksville and Campbell River.

By early 1996 work was well underway on the aforementioned segments, and later that year, on 5 October, the expressway segment from Mud Bay to Parksville was opened. The second section to open was the Nanaimo Parkway, which opened on 31 May 1997. It was followed shortly by the Duke Point Highway in June, and the Campbell River Bypass on 24 September. The next section, the Courtenay-Mud Bay link was opened almost two years later on 25 September 1999. The last part of the project was the Courtenay-Campbell River expressway, opened on 8 September 2001.  As a result of this project, Highway 19 is now the only highway in British Columbia to have ferry terminals at both ends.

Major intersections

References

External links 

BC Highways - Highway 19

019
Freeways in British Columbia
Campbell River, British Columbia
Parksville, British Columbia
Transport in Nanaimo
1953 establishments in British Columbia